Rosa 'Sunny Sky',  (aka  KORvestavi ), is a hybrid tea rose cultivar, bred by Tim Hermann Kordes in Germany in 1999. It was named an ADR rose award winner in 2015 and was awarded the Portland Gold Medal in 2017.

Description
'Sunny Sky' is a medium, bushy, upright shrub, 3 to 4 ft (90—121 cm) in height with a 2 ft (60 cm) spread. Blooms are large, 4—5 in (10—12 cm) in diameter. Buds are long and pointed. Blooms have a double (17-25 petals) high-centered form. They are borne mostly solitary and in small clusters. The flowers are yellow in color with a dark yellow center. The rose has a mild, fruity fragrance and glossy, medium green foliage. 'Sunny Sky' blooms in flushes throughout its growing season. The plant does not do well in USDA zone 6 and warmer.

Awards 
 ADR rose award, (2015)
 Portland Gold Medal, (2017)

See also
 Garden roses
 Rose Hall of Fame
 List of Award of Garden Merit roses

References

Sunny Sky